Francisco Suñé (born 1 February 1938) is a Spanish racing cyclist. He rode in the 1964 Tour de France.

References

External links
 

1938 births
Living people
Spanish male cyclists
Place of birth missing (living people)
People from Alt Camp
Sportspeople from the Province of Tarragona
Cyclists from Catalonia